A chandlery was originally the office in a wealthy medieval household responsible for wax and candles, as well as the room in which the candles were kept. It could be headed by a chandler. The office was subordinated to the kitchen, and only existed as a separate office in larger households. 

Whether a separate office or not, the function was naturally an important one, in a time before electric light, and when production of candles was often done privately. It was closely connected with other offices of the household, such as the ewery and the scullery. While this usage is obsolete today, the term can refer to a candle business. The current meaning of "chandler" is a person who sells candles.

By the 18th century, most commercial chandlers dealt in candles, oils, soap, and even paint. As these provided ships' stores, chandlery came to refer to a shop selling nautical items for ships and boats, although for a time they were called ship-chandleries to distinguish them. Americans used the term chandlery for these ship-chandleries, but tended to prefer the term chandler's shop.  Both terms are still in use. 

The job function and title, chandler, still exists as someone who works in the chandlery business or manages a chandler's shop. The term chandelier, at one time a ceiling fixture that held a number of candles, is still used. However, today chandeliers are usually based on electrical lighting.

See also
 History of candle making

Notes

External links
 

Medieval occupations
Candles